Mauro Mellini (10 February 1927 – 5 July 2020) was an Italian politician and lawyer.

Mellini was born in Civitavecchia on 10 February 1927. He studied law, and was first elected to the Chamber of Deputies in 1976 on the Radical Party ticket. Mellini remained in office until 1992. He died at the Gemelli University Hospital on 5 July 2020, aged 93.

References

1927 births
2020 deaths
Deputies of Legislature VII of Italy
Deputies of Legislature VIII of Italy
Deputies of Legislature IX of Italy
Deputies of Legislature X of Italy
20th-century Italian lawyers
Politicians from Rome
Radical Party (Italy) politicians